The 2012 Orange Open Guadeloupe was a professional tennis tournament played on hard courts. It was the second edition of the tournament which was part of the 2012 ATP Challenger Tour. It took place in Le Gosier, Guadeloupe between 26 March – 1 April 2012.

Singles main-draw entrants

Seeds

 1 Rankings are as of March 19, 2012.

Other entrants
The following players received wildcards into the singles main draw:
  James Blake
  Gianni Mina
  Josselin Ouanna
  Olivier Rochus

The following players received entry as an alternate into the singles main draw:
  Sergei Bubka
  Pierre-Ludovic Duclos
  Gastão Elias
  Thomas Fabbiano
  Yūichi Sugita
  Mischa Zverev

The following players received entry as a special exempt into the singles main draw:
  Maxime Authom

The following players received entry from the qualifying draw:
  Dan Evans
  Pierre-Hugues Herbert
  Ivo Klec
  Julien Obry

The following players received entry as a lucky loser into the singles main draw:
  Alexander Ward

Champions

Singles

 David Goffin def.  Mischa Zverev, 6–2, 6–2

Doubles

 Pierre-Hugues Herbert /  Albano Olivetti def.  Paul Hanley /  Jordan Kerr, 7–5, 1–6, [10–7]

External links
Official Website
ITF Search
ATP official site

Orange Open Guadeloupe
Open de Guadeloupe
2012 in French tennis
2012 in Guadeloupean sport